The 1989 World Polo Championship was played in Berlin, Germany during August 1989 and was won by the United States. This event brought together eight teams from around the world in the St. Moritz Polo Club.

Final Match

Final rankings

External links
FIP World Championship II

1989
Sports competitions in West Berlin
P
1989 in polo
Polo competitions in Germany
1980s in West Berlin